Joan Georgette Staniswalis (July 25, 1957 – April 13, 2018) was an American statistician who made "significant contributions to theory and biomedical applications" of statistics, including the effects of air quality and racial inequality on health.

Education and career
Staniswalis was born in Fort Lewis, Washington; her father was in the U.S. Army, and she lived in Panama City, Panama during his periods of service.

She attended California State University, Fullerton beginnining in 1975, and graduated in 1979, with high honors in mathematics and a minor in physics. She completed her Ph.D. in 1985 at the University of California, San Diego. Her dissertation, Local Bandwidth Selection for Kernel Estimates, was supervised by John A. Rice.

In 1984 she became a lecturer in business statistics at Virginia Commonwealth University (VCU), and in the following year she shifted to the department of biostatistics in VCU's Medical College of Virginia. She moved in 1990 to the University of Texas at El Paso (UTEP), where she was promoted to full professor in 1999. She remained at UTEP for the rest of her career, with the exception of a term in 2001 as visiting professor and interim associate dean at New Mexico State University. She retired to become a professor emeritus in 2016.

At UTEP, she directed the UTEP Statistical Consulting Laboratory from 1997 to 2003.

Recognition
Staniswalis was elected as a Fellow of the American Statistical Association in 2001, "for important contributions to nonparametric regression and its application to biomedical research; for collaborative research accomplishments and administrative leadership in consulting; for mentoring of students and junior researchers".

Selected publications

References

External links
Home page

1957 births
2018 deaths
American women statisticians
California State University, Fullerton alumni
University of California, San Diego alumni
Virginia Commonwealth University faculty
University of Texas at El Paso faculty
Fellows of the American Statistical Association
21st-century American women